Oliva parkinsoni is a species of sea snail, a marine gastropod mollusk in the family Olividae, the olives.

Description

Distribution

References

parkinsoni
Gastropods described in 1975